Martina Navratilova was the defending champion, but chose not to participate. Steffi Graf won the title, defeating Katerina Maleeva in the final, 6–1, 6–7, 6–3.

Seeds 
The top eight seeds received a bye to the second round.

Draw

Finals

Top half

Section 1

Section 2

Bottom half

Section 1

Section 2

References

External links 
 ITF tournament edition details

1990 WTA Tour
Canadian Open
Canadian Open (tennis)
Canadian Open